Antonio Parkinson (born July 14, 1969 in Oakland, California) is an American politician and a Democratic member of the Tennessee House of Representatives representing District 98 since his special election March 8, 2011 following the death of Representative Ulysses Jones, Jr.

Early life and business career 
Antonio Parkinson was born July 14, 1969 in Oakland, California. He served in the United States Marine Corps, which led him to reside in Memphis, Tennessee.  While living in Memphis, Parkinson joined the Shelby County Fire Department and rose to the ranks of Lieutenant before retiring.

Antonio Parkinson owns Black Market Strategies, a public relations and marketing firm. Prior to becoming owner, he served on the board of directors of ABetterMemphis.com, which created a vehicle for citizens of Memphis and Shelby County to voice their likes, dislikes, opinions and solutions for issues and opportunities within the city and county. Parkinson is also a member of Breath of Life Christian Center.

Member of the Tennessee House of Representatives 
Antonio Parkinson won a special election on March 8, 2011, in the 98th Legislative District of Tennessee following the death of Representative Ulysses Jones, Jr. Parkinson won 3,811 votes (nearly 100%) against write-in candidate Artie Smith.  In 2012 Parkinson was unopposed for the August 2, 2012 Democratic Primary, winning with 3,688 votes and won the November 6, 2012 General election with 15,271 votes (100%) against write-in candidate Jacques Roberts.

Antonio Parkinson has been named Tennessee Legislator of the Year four times with one of the awards being Regional Legislator of the Year. Parkinson recognizes himself as a staunch fighter for public education and justice reform.

Some of the more noteworthy legislation that Parkinson has passed is: The Healthy Workplace Act to eliminate workplace bullying in Tennessee; Kimberlee's Law to ensure that criminals convicted of aggravated rape serve 100% of their sentence (Tennessee is the first state in the union to pass Kimberlee type of legislation); The Neighborhood Protection Act to standing Neighborhood Associations, watch groups and others to file restraining orders for relief from criminals that target their neighborhoods; TN House of Representatives Cosmetology law, that created apprenticeships for cosmetology students and allows for free standing schools of natural hair, aesthetics and manicuring in the state of Tennessee.

References

External links
Official page at the Tennessee General Assembly
Campaign site

Antonio Parkinson at Ballotpedia
Antonio Parkinson at the National Institute on Money in State Politics

Living people
African-American state legislators in Tennessee
Democratic Party members of the Tennessee House of Representatives
Politicians from Memphis, Tennessee
Politicians from Oakland, California
United States Marines
21st-century American politicians
21st-century African-American politicians
1969 births